Everton is a Liverpool City Council Ward in the Liverpool Walton Parliamentary constituency. The ward boundary was changed in 2004 when the number of councillors was reduced.

Councillors

 indicates seat up for re-election after boundary changes.

 indicates seat up for re-election.

 indicates change in affiliation.

 indicates seat up for re-election after casual vacancy.

Election results

Elections of the 2010s

Elections of the 2000s 

After the boundary change of 2004 the whole of Liverpool City Council faced election. Three Councillors were returned.

• italics - Denotes the sitting Councillor.
• bold - Denotes the winning candidate.

References

External links
Ward Profile - Everton

Notes

Wards of Liverpool